The Toyota G Sports or G's is a range of enhancements to some cars manufactured by Toyota. The enhancements include body kits, interiors, wheels, suspension, and drive-line components. In 2016, the G's lineup was changed to GR Sport lineup.

The launch at the January 2010 Tokyo Auto Salon had the following vehicles on display:
 FT-86 G Sports Concept
 Noah G Sports Concept
 Voxy G Sports Concept
 Mark X G Sports Concept
 Prius G Sports Concept

The production models include:
 Vitz RS G's
 Mark X G's
 Prius G's
 Aqua G's
 Harrier G's
 Prius α G's
 Noah G's/Voxy G's
 Alphard G's/Vellfire G's

See also 
 Toyota Gazoo Racing

References 

G Sports